This is a list of all United States Supreme Court cases from volume 472 of the United States Reports:

External links

1985 in United States case law